The Upper Iowa Peacocks (also UIU Peacocks) are the athletic teams that represent Upper Iowa University, located in Fayette, Iowa, in intercollegiate sports at the Division II level of the National Collegiate Athletic Association (NCAA), primarily competing in the Northern Sun Intercollegiate Conference (NSIC) for most of their sports since the 2006–07 academic year; except for men's soccer, which is an associate member of the Mid-America Intercollegiate Athletics Association (MIAA). The Peacocks previously competed in the Iowa Intercollegiate Athletic Conference (IIAC; now currently known as the American Rivers Conference since the 2018–19 academic year) of the NCAA Division III ranks from 1922–23 to 2002–03. Their colors are blue and white.

Upper Iowa competes in 22 intercollegiate varsity sports: Men's sports began baseball, basketball, bowling, cross country, football, golf, soccer, track & field and wrestling; while women's sports include basketball, bowling, cross country, golf, lacrosse, soccer, softball, tennis, track & field and volleyball; and co-ed sports include cheerleading, dance, esports, spirit squad and shotgun sports.

Varsity teams

Softball
Upper Iowa's softball team appeared in two Women's College World Series, in 1970 and 1971.

Men's soccer
Upper Iowa's men's soccer team won the MIAA conference title in 2015. In the same year they reached the 'Sweet 16' stage of the NCAA tournament.

References

External links